Mutual Defense Treaty between the United States and the Republic of Korea is a treaty between South Korea and the United States signed on 1 October 1953, two months after the signing of the Korean Armistice Agreement which brought a halt to the fighting in the Korean War. The agreement commits the two countries to provide mutual aid if either faces external armed attack and allows the United States to station military forces in South Korea in consultation with the South Korean government.

Provisions of the treaty

US - ROK relationships prior to the Mutual Defense Treaty 
The first treaty ever established between the United States and Korea occurred in 1882 with the Treaty of Peace, Amity, Commerce, and Navigation. This treaty was between the US and the Joseon Dynasty  and a year later in 1883 the first American diplomat traveled to Korea and created a more permanent alliance which lasted until the Japanese colonialization in 1910.  In the aftermath of the defeat of the Axis, Korea was separated into two different sections and each of these halves was supported by one of the two major powers of the world. South Korea was created and was backed by the United States, while North Korea was founded and supported by the Soviet Union.  It was during this time in 1949 that the US once again forged a bond with Korea, and in 1950 North Korea invaded South Korea and began the Korean War.

Effects of the treaty 
 
The Mutual Defense Treaty between South Korea and the United States had many lasting political, social, and economic effects. From weeks after the treaty was signed to present day, the Mutual Defense Treaty affected both South Korea and the United States in unexpected ways. In regards to South Korea, the signing of the Mutual Defense Treaty quickly ended the Korean War.  28,500 American troops were stationed in South Korea. 

The Korean Armistice Agreement was signed only two months prior to the signing of the Mutual Defense Treaty. 

The Mutual Defense Treaty also had substantial effects on the economies of both The United States and South Korea. South Korea's economy dramatically increased as a result of this relationship.  In regards to other US alliances, there has not been a change as dramatic as the increase of South Korea's economic wealth. From the time that the Mutual Defense Treaty was signed in 1953 to 2015, South Koreans went from being ten percent as wealthy as Americans to seventy percent as wealthy as Americans. As a result of this sudden change, South Korea faced a change in expectations regarding their technology innovations. South Korea has depended on the United States for their technology prior to the Mutual Defense Treaty, however, they have encountered a new pressure to develop their own defense technologies now that they have the economic power to do so as a result of the Mutual Defense Treaty.

South Korean beliefs about the treaty 
After the signing of the treaty there was tension between the Republic of Korea and the United States due to many people in South Korea believed that the United States would not hold up their side of the treaty. This belief was strengthened with the withdrawal of troops under the presidencies of Nixon and Carter.  Another point of contention was in 1980 and had to do with the belief that many of the U.S. troops stationed in Korea were supportive of Park Chung-hee, the leader of South Korea at that time. 

In 2009, under the Obama administration, the White House released a Joint Vision Statement in which it stated the goals of the two states going forward. The statement put forth that the Mutual Defense Treaty has acted as the foundation for the rest of the cooperation that has occurred between the Republic of Korea and the United States.  Going forward the two governments will not only focus on security, but also economic, political, and social issues and interactions.  

With the advent of nuclear weapons, the Treaty soon became more about being protected from the threat of nuclear warfare. In a survey given in 2014 it was found that 52.2 per cent of South Koreans believed that the United States would retaliate with nuclear weapons if North Korea attacked them with nuclear warfare first.  While a little over half the citizens in South Korea think the United States would help, it was found that 61.3 per cent of citizens believe that the Republic of Korea needs to create their own arsenal of nuclear weapons.

See also 
 United Nations Command
 United States Forces Korea
 U.S.–South Korea Status of Forces Agreement
 Korean DMZ Conflict

References

External links 

 Mutual Defense Treaty Between the United States and the Republic of Korea at Yale University Law Library's Avalon Project.

South Korea–United States relations
United States military in South Korea
Military alliances involving the United States
1953 in South Korea
1953 in the United States
20th-century military alliances
21st-century military alliances
Cold War treaties
Cold War alliances and military strategy
Treaties concluded in 1953
Treaties entered into force in 1953
Military treaties